The National Museum of Natural History and Science in  Lisbon, Portugal is the country's main museum focusing on nature. The museum functions under the University of Lisbon.

Its rich collections, gathered over more than 250 years, span zoology, anthropology, geology and botany.

The museum has activities for the promotion of natural history and science awareness, with space for artistic exhibitions, conferences, debates, workshops and courses.

History

Its recent public designation, "MUHNAC - National Museum of Natural History and Science", was created in October 2011. This incorporated the former National Museum of Natural History and the University of Lisbon Science Museum, integrating their collections, the historical buildings of the Polytechnic School, the Lisbon Botanical Gardens and, since July 2012, the Lisbon Astronomical Observatory :

The history of natural history collections in Lisbon began in the Royal Natural Cabinet and Botanical Garden, created in the second half of the eighteenth century, in Ajuda (western Lisbon). It was then housed for a short period in the Royal Academy of Sciences and transferred to the Polytechnic School in 1858, with the denomination of National Museum of Lisbon (1861) and under the administration of the Polytechnic School.

The second Botanic Gardens of Lisbon, in the grounds of the Polytechnic School officially opened in 1878.

In 1911, with the creation of the University of Lisbon, the Museum was annexed to the Faculty of Sciences.

In March 1978 a devastating fire destroyed part of the building of the former Polytechnic School, most of the zoology collection and part of the geology collection. The Faculty of Sciences would eventually move to its current premises in Campo Grande.

The Science Museum of the University of Lisbon was created in May 1985, sharing the building with the National Museum of Natural History.

Both museums adopted new by-laws in 2003, becoming autonomous from the Faculty of Sciences and under the direct administration of the Rector of the University of Lisbon.

See also
 University of Lisbon

References

External links
 

Natural history museums in Portugal
National museums of Portugal
Museums established in 1926
Museums in Lisbon
University of Lisbon
University museums